Asbjørn Eide (born 11 February 1933) is a Norwegian human rights scholar with base in Law and Social Science Research. He was married October 10, 1959, to Professor of nutritional physiology Wenche Barth Eide (b. 1935), and the father of former Norwegian Minister of Defence (2011–12) and Minister of Foreign Affairs (2012-13) Espen Barth Eide.

Biography 
Eide is one of Norway's foremost experts on human rights. As a researcher and specialist, he has been particularly concerned with indigenous and minority issues, and he has held important assignments in these fields both in Norway and in the United Nations system. He was the founding Director of the Norwegian Center for Human Rights at the University of Oslo, having first started (with Torkel Opsahl) the Human Rights Project at the Peace Research Institute Oslo which became the Norwegian Institute of Human Rights. From 1971 to 1975, Secretary-General of the International Peace Research Association.

In 1981 Eide was elected member of the UN Sub-Commission on the Promotion and Protection of Human Rights (UN Sub-Commission on Human Rights, 1981—2003). He was subsequently re-elected several times as the only Nordic member, and was responsible for developing a number of its studies. As a member of the Sub-Commission Eide was one of the advocates for the establishment of the Working Group on Indigenous Populations, and became its first chairman from 1982 to 1983. This was the first official international forum where the Indigenous peoples' own representatives were given the opportunity to present their requests and demands. The work has been of great importance for the further development of international law on Indigenous peoples.

After the end of the Cold War and the dissolution of the Soviet Union, there was an outbreak of many serious ethnic conflicts, and Eide prepared a study for the Commission on "peaceful and constructive ways" to address minority situations. This study led the UN to initiate a new working group for the protection of minorities, and Eide was chair of this UN Working Group on the Rights of Minorities (1995—2004). Eide has also published a large number of articles and books, alone or together with Nordic and international colleagues in the fields of peace research and international human rights.  He has been in the forefront of supporting open access in international law through his publications and as Principal Scientific Adviser to the Torkel Opsahl Academic EPublisher.

Honors 
2010: Order of St. Olav awarded for his work on Human rights

Publications (in selection) 
1978: Fattig, ufri og mishandlet. Om det internasjonale menneskerettighetsvernet
1979: The World Military Order (with Mary Kaldor)
1980: Problems of Contemporary Militarism (with M. Thee)
1984: Food as a Human Right
1992: The Universal Declaration of Human Rights: A Commentary
1992: Human Rights in Perspective. A Global Assessment (with Bernt Hagtvet eds.)
1995: Peaceful and Constructive Resolution of Situations Involving Minorities
1999: The Universal Declaration of Human Rights. A Common Standard of Achievement (with Gudmundur Alfredsson eds.)

References

External links

Biography
Biography
Biography
Books by A. Eide
Torkel Opsahl Academic EPublisher

1933 births
Living people
Norwegian legal scholars
Members of the Sub-Commission on the Promotion and Protection of Human Rights
Norwegian officials of the United Nations